"Youngblood" is the fifth and final single released from Swedish boy band E.M.D.'s debut studio album A State of Mind. The song was released as a digital download only.

Chart positions
"Youngblood" was the first of E.M.D.'s singles not to reach the top position of the Swedish singles chart. The song debuted and peaked at #22 and only charted for four weeks, thus becoming the group's least successful release to date.

Music video
The music video was released on October 22, 2009 via YouTube. The music video was shot in Las Vegas.

References

2009 singles
E.M.D. songs
2008 songs
Song articles with missing songwriters